Poy Sippi is an unincorporated census-designated place in the town of Poy Sippi in Waushara County, Wisconsin, United States. It is located at the intersection of Wisconsin Highway 49 and County H. As of the 2010 census, its population is 371.

Images

References

Census-designated places in Waushara County, Wisconsin
Census-designated places in Wisconsin